Freeze Out may refer to:

 Freeze Out (2005 film)
 The Freeze-Out, 1921 western starring Harry Carey
 Freeze Out (game show), ITV game show
 "Frozen Out" is a term used in Association Football to refer to a player, who regardless of their capability to play, is being rejected by club leadership. In order to make them leave the club before their contract expires, the club might stop the player training, demote them to youth or reserve teams, make offers to other teams for the player and make negative statements to the media about the player.

See also
 Ione, California, previously known as Freeze Out